The 2005–06 Buffalo Sabres season was the 36th season of operation, 35th season of play, for the National Hockey League franchise that was established on May 22, 1970. The season not only saw the team qualify for the Stanley Cup playoffs for the first time since the 2000–01 season, but saw them advance to Game 7 of the Eastern Conference finals before losing to the eventual Stanley Cup champions, the Carolina Hurricanes.

After starting the season 7–8–0 through their first 15 games by November 9, 2005, the Sabres were sitting in fifth place in the Northeast Division and were trailing the Northeast Division-leading Ottawa Senators by 11 points. The Sabres then went on to have only eight regulation losses out of their next 50 games; by March 16, 2006, they had improved to 44–16–5 to move within one point of the Northeast Division-leading Senators. Despite having only two players to play all 82 games (Ales Kotalik and Henrik Tallinder), Buffalo would finish the season with a 52–24–6 record for 110 points and a fourth-place finish heading into the playoffs. The season was the first 100–point season in 23 years and tied the 1979–80 club for the second-best point total in franchise history. The Sabres were one of five teams to reach the century mark in power-play goals during the regular season, scoring 101.  The Sabres also finished with 25 road wins, another franchise record.

The Sabres were recognized on June 22, 2006, at the NHL Awards Ceremony, when Lindy Ruff edged Hurricanes coach Peter Laviolette to win the Jack Adams Award as Coach of the Year in the closest vote in the award's history. Ruff was the second Sabres coach to win the award.

Regular season
On January 14, 2006, the Sabres defeated the Los Angeles Kings at home by a score of 10–1. Jochen Hecht and Jason Pominville each had hat-tricks in the game. It was the first time that the Sabres had scored 10 goals in a regular-season game since February 24, 1993, when they defeated the Detroit Red Wings at home by a score of 10–7.

Season standings

Playoffs

The Buffalo Sabres earned the fourth seed in the Eastern Conference.

Buffalo defeated the Philadelphia Flyers in the first-round of the 2006 playoffs in six games. In the second round, the Sabres defeated top-seeded Ottawa in five games.  A total of three victories in the series came in overtime, including the series-clinching Game 5, which was won on a short-handed goal by Jason Pominville to send Buffalo to the Eastern Conference Finals against the Carolina Hurricanes. It was the first time in NHL history that a series had been decided on a short-handed overtime goal.

Despite being without some or all of their four top defensemen (Teppo Numminen, Dmitri Kalinin, Jay McKee and Henrik Tallinder), and their top powerplay scorer, Tim Connolly, who had 11 points in eight games in the playoffs, for much of the series, the Sabres fought back from a three-games-to-two deficit to force a seventh game by way of a 2–1 overtime win in Game 6.  Buffalo led the Hurricanes 2–1 going into the final period of the deciding game but blew the lead early in the third and gave up two more late goals for a 4–2 final score.

Schedule and results

Regular season

|- align="center" bgcolor="#bbffbb"
| 1 || October 5 || NY Islanders  || 4 – 6 || Buffalo || || Miller || 15,702 || 1–0–0 || 2 || 
|- align="center" bgcolor="#bbffbb"
| 2 || October 7 || Boston || 1 – 4 || Buffalo || || Miller || 13,771 || 2–0–0 || 4 || 
|- align="center" bgcolor="#ffbbbb"
| 3 || October 8 || Buffalo || 0 – 5 || Ottawa ||  || Miller || 19,661 || 2–1–0 || 4 || 
|- align="center" bgcolor="#bbffbb"
| 4 || October 10 || Pittsburgh || 2 – 3 || Buffalo || OT || Miller || 12,050 || 3–1–0 || 6 || 
|- align="center" bgcolor="#bbffbb"
| 5 || October 13 || Buffalo || 4 – 3 || Tampa Bay || SO || Miller || 20,184 || 4–1–0 || 8 || 
|- align="center" bgcolor="#ffbbbb"
| 6 || October 15 || Buffalo || 2 – 3 || Florida || || Miller || 17,426 || 4–2–0 || 8 || 
|- align="center" bgcolor="#bbffbb"
| 7 || October 20 || Buffalo || 4 – 3 || Boston || || Miller || 14,525 || 5–2–0 || 10 || 
|- align="center" bgcolor="#bbffbb"
| 8 || October 22 || NY Rangers || 1 – 3 || Buffalo || || Miller || 16,346 || 6–2–0 || 12 || 
|- align="center" bgcolor="#ffbbbb"
| 9 || October 26 || Washington || 3 – 2 || Buffalo || || Miller || 8,552 || 6–3–0 || 12 || 
|- align="center" bgcolor="#ffbbbb"
| 10 || October 28 || Buffalo || 2 – 3 || New Jersey || || Miller || 12,378 || 6–4–0 || 12 || 
|- align="center" bgcolor="#bbffbb"
| 11 || October 29 || Buffalo || 6 – 4 || NY Islanders || || Biron || 13,226 || 7–4–0 || 14 || 
|-

|- align="center" bgcolor="#ffbbbb"
| 12 || November 2 || Ottawa || 10 – 4  || Buffalo || || Noronen || 13,905 || 7–5–0 || 14 || 
|- align="center" bgcolor="#ffbbbb"
| 13 || November 4 || Montreal || 3 – 2 || Buffalo || || Biron || 18,690 || 7–6–0 || 14 || 
|- align="center" bgcolor="#ffbbbb"
| 14 || November 5 || Buffalo || 2 – 3 || Montreal || || Biron || 21,273 || 7–7–0 || 14 || 
|- align="center" bgcolor="#ffbbbb"
| 15 || November 9 || Carolina || 5 – 3 || Buffalo || || Biron || 13,106 || 7–8–0 || 14 || 
|- align="center" bgcolor="#bbffbb"
| 16 || November 11 || Toronto || 2 – 5 || Buffalo || || Biron || 18,690 || 8–8–0 || 16 || 
|- align="center" bgcolor="#ffbbbb"
| 17 || November 12 || Buffalo || 1 – 6 || Ottawa || || Biron || 19,414 || 8–9–0 || 16 || 
|- align="center" bgcolor="#bbffbb"
| 18 || November 15 || New Jersey || 1 – 4 || Buffalo || || Biron || 13,022 || 9–9–0 || 18 || 
|- align="center" bgcolor="#bbffbb"
| 19 || November 17 || Washington || 5 – 8 || Buffalo || || Biron || 12,471 || 10–9–0 || 20 || 
|- align="center" bgcolor="#bbffbb"
| 20 || November 19 || Buffalo || 3 – 2 || Boston || || Noronen || 17,565 || 11–9–0 || 22 || 
|- align="center"
| 21 || November 22 || NY Rangers || 3 – 2 || Buffalo || SO || Biron || 16,018 || 11–9–1 || 23 || 
|- align="center" bgcolor="#bbffbb"
| 22 || November 23 || Buffalo || 4 – 3 || NY Islanders || SO || Biron || 13,212 || 12–9–1 || 25 || 
|- align="center" bgcolor="#bbffbb"
| 23 || November 25 || Montreal || 1 – 3 || Buffalo || || Biron || 16,009 || 13–9–1 || 27 || 
|- align="center" bgcolor="#bbffbb"
| 24 || November 27 || Buffalo || 3 – 2 || Washington || || Biron ||11,658 || 14–9–1 || 29 || 
|- align="center" bgcolor="#bbffbb"
| 25 || November 29 || Buffalo || 3 – 2 || Pittsburgh || || Biron || 15,118 || 15–9–1 || 31 || 
|-

|- align="center" bgcolor="#bbffbb"
| 26 || December 1 || Buffalo || 3 – 2 || Montreal || OT || Biron || 21,274 || 16–9–1 || 33 || 
|- align="center" bgcolor="#ffbbbb"
| 27 || December 2 || San Jose || 5 – 0 || Buffalo || || Noronen || 18,007 || 16–10–1 || 33 || 
|- align="center" bgcolor="#bbffbb"
| 28 || December 4 || Buffalo || 6 – 4 || Colorado || || Biron || 18,007 || 17–10–1 || 35 || 
|- align="center" bgcolor="#bbffbb"
| 29 || December 8 || Anaheim || 2 – 3 || Buffalo || OT || Biron || 12,504 || 18–10–1 || 37 || 
|- align="center" bgcolor="#bbffbb"
| 30 || December 11 || Buffalo || 3 – 2 || Minnesota || || Biron || 18,568 || 19–10–1 || 39 || 
|- align="center" bgcolor="#bbffbb"
| 31 || December 14 || Dallas || 3 – 4 || Buffalo || || Biron || 16,575 || 20–10–1 || 41 || 
|- align="center" bgcolor="#bbffbb"
| 32 || December 16 ||  Buffalo || 4 – 3 || Pittsburgh || OT || Biron || 16,648 || 21–10–1 || 43 || 
|- align="center" bgcolor="#bbffbb"
| 33 || December 17 || Pittsburgh || 3 – 4 || Buffalo || || Biron || 18,690 || 22–10–1 || 45 || 
|- align="center" bgcolor="#bbffbb"
| 34 || December 19 || Buffalo || 2 – 1 || Philadelphia || SO || Miller || 19,572 || 23–10–1 || 47 || 
|- align="center" bgcolor="#ffbbbb"
| 35 || December 22 || Buffalo || 1 – 4 || Florida || || Biron || 17,823 || 23–11–1 || 47 || 
|- align="center" bgcolor="#bbffbb"
| 36 || December 23 || Buffalo || 4 – 1 || Tampa Bay || || Miller || 21,120 || 24–11–1 || 49 || 
|- align="center" bgcolor="#bbffbb"
| 37 || December 26 || NY Islanders || 3 – 6 || Buffalo || || Miller || 18,690 || 25–11–1 || 51 || 
|- align="center"
| 38 || December 29 || Buffalo || 3 – 4 || Toronto || SO || Biron || 19,364 || 25–11–2 || 52 || 
|- align="center" bgcolor="#bbffbb"
| 39 || December 30 || Atlanta || 1 – 4 || Buffalo || || Miller || 18,690 || 26–11–2 || 54 || 
|-

|- align="center" bgcolor="#ffbbbb"
| 40 || January 1 || Florida || 2 – 1 || Buffalo || || Miller || 18,690 || 26–12–2 || 54 || 
|- align="center" bgcolor="#bbffbb"
| 41 || January 5 || Tampa Bay || 1 – 3 || Buffalo || || Miller || 18,032 || 27–12–2 || 56 || 
|- align="center" bgcolor="#ffbbbb"
| 42 || January 7 || New Jersey || 3 – 2 || Buffalo || || Miller || 18,690 || 27–13–2 || 56 || 
|- align="center"
| 43 || January 12 || Phoenix || 2 – 1 || Buffalo || SO || Biron || 18,690 || 27–13–3 || 57 || 
|- align="center" bgcolor="#bbffbb"
| 44 || January 14 || Los Angeles || 1 – 10 || Buffalo || || Miller || 18,690 || 28–13–3 || 59 || 
|- align="center" bgcolor="#bbffbb"
| 45 || January 16 || Buffalo || 3 – 1 || Edmonton || || Miller || 16,839 || 29–13–3 || 61 || 
|- align="center" bgcolor="#ffbbbb"
| 46 || January 19 || Buffalo || 1 – 4 || Vancouver || || Miller || 18,630 || 29–14–3 || 61 || 
|- align="center" bgcolor="#ffbbbb"
| 47 || January 21 || Buffalo || 1 – 4 || Calgary || || Biron || 19,289 || 29–15–3 || 61 || 
|- align="center" bgcolor="#bbffbb"
| 48 || January 24 || Buffalo || 2 – 1 || NY Rangers || || Miller || 18,200 || 30–15–3 || 63 || 
|- align="center" bgcolor="#bbffbb"
| 49 || January 26 || Buffalo || 8 – 4 || Toronto || || Miller || 19,477 || 31–15–3 || 65 || 
|- align="center" bgcolor="#bbffbb"
| 50 || January 31 || Buffalo || 5 – 2 || Atlanta || || Miller || 14,021 || 32–15–3 || 67 || 
|-

|- align="center" bgcolor="#bbffbb"
| 51 || February 2 || Philadelphia || 2 – 4 || Buffalo || || Miller || 18,690 || 33–15–3 || 69 || 
|- align="center" bgcolor="#bbffbb"
| 52 || February 4 || Ottawa || 1 – 2 || Buffalo || SO || Miller || 17,451 || 34–15–3 || 71 || 
|- align="center" bgcolor="#bbffbb"
| 53 || February 7 || Buffalo || 3 – 2 || Montreal || OT || Miller || 21,273 || 35–15–3 || 73 || 
|- align="center"
| 54 || February 9 || Montreal || 3 – 2 || Buffalo || OT || Miller || 17,344 || 35–15–4 || 74 || 
|- align="center" bgcolor="#bbffbb"
| 55 || February 11 || Florida || 3 – 5 || Buffalo || || Miller || 18,690 || 36–15–4 || 76 || 
|- align="center"
| 56 || February 12 || Buffalo || 3 – 4 || Carolina || SO || Miller || 18,730 || 36–15–5 || 77 || 
|-

|- align="center" bgcolor="#ffbbbb"
| 57 || March 1 || Atlanta || 4 – 2 || Buffalo || || Miller || 18,690 || 36–16–5 || 77 || 
|- align="center" bgcolor="#bbffbb"
| 58 || March 3 || Toronto || 2 – 6 || Buffalo || || Miller || 18,690 || 37–16–5 || 79 || 
|- align="center" bgcolor="#bbffbb"
| 59 || March 4 || Buffalo || 3 – 2 || Boston || || Biron || 16,065 || 38–16–5 || 81 || 
|- align="center" bgcolor="#bbffbb"
| 60 || March 7 || Boston || 2 – 3 || Buffalo || || Miller || 18,117 || 39–16–5 || 83 || 
|- align="center" bgcolor="#bbffbb"
| 61 || March 9 || Tampa Bay || 5 – 8 || Buffalo || || Miller || 17,934 || 40–16–5 || 85 || 
|- align="center" bgcolor="#bbffbb"
| 62 || March 11 || Buffalo || 6 – 5 || Philadelphia || || Biron || 19,717 || 41–16–5 || 87 || 
|- align="center" bgcolor="#bbffbb"
| 63 || March 12 || Boston || 2 – 6 || Buffalo || || Biron || 18,690 || 42–16–5 || 89 || 
|- align="center" bgcolor="#bbffbb"
| 64 || March 14 || Buffalo || 6 – 4 || Washington || || Miller || 14,386 || 43–16–5 || 91 || 
|- align="center" bgcolor="#bbffbb"
| 65 || March 16 || Toronto || 1 – 3 || Buffalo || || Miller || 18,690 || 44–16–5 || 93 || 
|- align="center" bgcolor="#ffbbbb"
| 66 || March 18 || Buffalo || 2 – 4 || Ottawa || || Miller || 19,947 || 44–17–5 || 93 || 
|- align="center" bgcolor="#ffbbbb"
| 67 || March 20 || Buffalo || 0 – 5 || Atlanta || || Biron || 14,133 || 44–18–5 || 93 || 
|- align="center" bgcolor="#ffbbbb"
| 68 || March 22 || Carolina || 4 – 3 || Buffalo || || Miller || 18,690 || 44–19–5 || 93 || 
|- align="center" bgcolor="#ffbbbb"
| 69 || March 24 || Ottawa || 3 – 1 || Buffalo || || Miller || 18,690 || 44–20–5 || 93 || 
|- align="center" bgcolor="#ffbbbb"
| 70 || March 25 || Buffalo || 4 – 5 || Boston || || Miller || 15,710 || 44–21–5 || 93 || 
|- align="center"
| 71 || March 27 || Buffalo || 4 – 5 || NY Rangers || SO || Miller || 18,200 || 44–21–6 || 94 || 
|- align="center" bgcolor="#bbffbb"
| 72 || March 29 || Boston || 3 – 4 || Buffalo || || Miller || 16,261 || 45–21–6 || 96 || 
|- align="center" bgcolor="#ffbbbb"
| 73 || March 30 || Buffalo || 1 – 3 || New Jersey || || Biron || 12,425 || 45–22–6 || 96 || 
|-

|- align="center" bgcolor="#ffbbbb"
| 74 || April 1 || Buffalo || 0 – 7 || Toronto || || Miller || 19,434 || 45–23–6 || 96 || 
|- align="center" bgcolor="#bbffbb"
| 75 || April 3 || Buffalo || 3 – 2 || Toronto || SO || Biron || 19,320 || 46–23–6 || 98 || 
|- align="center" bgcolor="#bbffbb"
| 76 || April 5 || Ottawa || 4 – 5 || Buffalo || OT || Biron || 17,622 || 47–23–6 || 100 || 
|- align="center" bgcolor="#ffbbbb"
| 77 || April 7 || Philadelphia || 4 – 2 || Buffalo || || Miller || 16,909 || 47–24–6 || 100 || 
|- align="center" bgcolor="#bbffbb"
| 78 || April 8 || Buffalo || 6 – 2 || Ottawa || || Miller || 19,575 || 48–24–6 || 102 || 
|- align="center" bgcolor="#bbffbb"
| 79 || April 12 || Montreal || 1 – 3 || Buffalo || || Miller || 18,201 || 49–24–6 || 104 || 
|- align="center" bgcolor="#bbffbb"
| 80 || April 15 || Buffalo || 4 – 2 || Montreal || || Miller || 21,273 || 50–24–6 || 106 || 
|- align="center" bgcolor="#bbffbb"
| 81 || April 16 || Toronto || 0 – 6 || Buffalo || || Miller || 18,690 || 51–24–6 || 108 || 
|- align="center" bgcolor="#bbffbb"
| 82 || April 18 || Buffalo || 4 – 0 || Carolina || || Biron || 18,730 || 52–24–6 || 110 || 
|-

|-
| Legend:

Playoffs

|- style="background:#bbffbb;"
| 1 || April 22 || Philadelphia || 2 – 3 || Buffalo || 2OT || Miller || 18,690 || Sabres lead 1–0 || 
|- style="background:#bbffbb;"
| 2 || April 24 || Philadelphia || 2 – 8 || Buffalo ||  || Miller || 18,690  || Sabres lead 2–0 || 
|- style="background:#ffbbbb;"
| 3 || April 26 || Buffalo || 2 – 4 || Philadelphia ||  || Miller || 19,984 || Sabres lead 2–1 || 
|- style="background:#ffbbbb;"
| 4 || April 28 || Buffalo || 4 – 5 || Philadelphia ||  || Miller || 20,092 || Series tied 2–2 || 
|- style="background:#bbffbb;"
| 5 || April 30 || Philadelphia || 0 – 3 || Buffalo ||  || Miller || 18,690 || Sabres lead 3–2 || 
|- style="background:#bbffbb;"
| 6 || May 2 || Buffalo || 7 – 1 || Philadelphia ||  || Miller || 19,967 || Sabres win 4–2 || 
|-

|- align="center" bgcolor="#bbffbb"
| 1 || May 5 || Buffalo || 7 – 6 || Ottawa || OT || Miller || 19,544 || Sabres lead 1–0 || 
|- align="center" bgcolor="#bbffbb"
| 2 || May 8 || Buffalo || 2 – 1 || Ottawa || || Miller || 19,816 || Sabres lead 2–0 || 
|- align="center" bgcolor="#bbffbb"
| 3 || May 10 || Ottawa || 2 – 3 || Buffalo || OT || Miller || 18,690 || Sabres lead 3–0 || 
|- align="center" bgcolor="#ffbbbb"
| 4 || May 11 || Ottawa || 2 – 1 || Buffalo || || Miller || 18,690 || Sabres lead 3–1 || 
|- align="center" bgcolor="#bbffbb"
| 5 || May 13 || Buffalo || 3 – 2 || Ottawa || OT || Miller || 20,024 || Sabres win 4–1 || 
|-

|- align="center" bgcolor="#bbffbb"
| 1 || May 20 || Buffalo || 3 – 2 || Carolina || || Miller || 18,730 || Sabres lead 1–0 || 
|- align="center" bgcolor="#ffbbbb"
| 2 || May 22 || Buffalo || 3 – 4 || Carolina || || Miller || 18,730 || Series tied 1–1 || 
|- align="center" bgcolor="#bbffbb"
| 3 || May 24 || Carolina || 3 – 4 || Buffalo || || Miller || 18,690 || Sabres lead 2–1 || 
|- align="center" bgcolor="#ffbbbb"
| 4 || May 26 || Carolina || 4 – 0 || Buffalo || || Miller || 18,690 || Series tied 2–2 || 
|- align="center" bgcolor="#ffbbbb"
| 5 || May 28 || Buffalo || 3 – 4 || Carolina || OT || Miller || 18,730 || Hurricanes lead 3–2 || 
|- align="center" bgcolor="#bbffbb"
| 6 || May 30 || Carolina || 1 – 2 || Buffalo || OT || Miller || 18,690 || Series tied 3–3 || 
|- align="center" bgcolor="#ffbbbb"
| 7 || June 1 || Buffalo || 2 – 4 || Carolina || || Miller || 18,730 || Hurricanes win 4–3 || 
|-

|-
| Legend:

Player statistics

Scoring
 Position abbreviations: C = Center; D = Defense; G = Goaltender; LW = Left Wing; RW = Right Wing
  = Left team via a transaction (e.g., trade, waivers, release) during the season. Stats reflect time with the Sabres only.

Goaltending
  = Left team via a transaction (e.g., trade, waivers, release) during the season. Stats reflect time with the Sabres only.

Awards and records

Awards

Transactions
The Sabres were involved in the following transactions from February 17, 2005, the day after the 2004–05 NHL season was officially cancelled, through June 19, 2006, the day of the deciding game of the 2006 Stanley Cup Finals.

Trades

Players acquired

Players lost

Signings

Draft picks
As there was no 2004–05 season to set the order for the draft, a lottery was held in which teams were assigned a number of balls, between one and three, based on the number of playoff appearances the team had had in the past three seasons.  As the Sabres had missed the playoffs three consecutive seasons, they were one of only four teams which had the full allotment of three balls in the lottery.  Despite this advantage, the Sabres only ended up with the 13th overall pick.

Buffalo's picks at the 2005 NHL Entry Draft in Ottawa, Ontario:

See also
 2005–06 NHL season

Notes

References

Buff
Buff
Buffalo Sabres seasons
Buffalo
Buffalo